Danthoniopsis is a genus of Asian and African plants in the grass family.

 Species
 Danthoniopsis acutigluma Chippind. - Zaïre, Zambia
 Danthoniopsis aptera R.I.S.Correia & Phipps - Angola
 Danthoniopsis barbata (Nees) C.E.Hubb. - eastern Africa, Arabian Peninsula
 Danthoniopsis chevalieri A.Camus & C.E.Hubb. - western Africa
 Danthoniopsis chimanimaniensis (J.B.Phipps) Clayton - Zimbabwe, Mozambique
 Danthoniopsis dinteri (Pilg.) C.E.Hubb. - southern Africa
 Danthoniopsis lignosa C.E.Hubb. - Angola., Namibia
 Danthoniopsis parva (J.B.Phipps) Clayton - Limpopo
 Danthoniopsis petiolata (J.B.Phipps) Clayton - Zambia, Zimbabwe
 Danthoniopsis pruinosa C.E.Hubb. - Tanzania, Zambia, Zimbabwe, Limpopo, Mpumalanga, KwaZulu-Natal
 Danthoniopsis ramosa (Stapf) Clayton - Namibia, Cape Province
 Danthoniopsis scopulorum (J.B.Phipps) J.B.Phipps - KwaZulu-Natal
 Danthoniopsis simulans (C.E.Hubb.) Clayton - Central African Republic
 Danthoniopsis stocksii (Boiss.) C.E.Hubb. - Iran, Pakistan
 Danthoniopsis viridis (Rendle) C.E.Hubb. - Congo Republic, Zaïre, Angola, Zambia, Zimbabwe
 Danthoniopsis wasaensis C.E.Hubb. - Zaïre

 Formerly included
see Dilophotriche Jansenella Tristachya

References

Panicoideae
Poaceae genera